"This Is Stranger Than Love" is a single by British vocalist Mark Stewart, released in September 1987 on Mute Records.

Formats and track listing 
UK 7" single (MUTE 59)
"This Is Stranger Than Love" – 7:13
"This Is Stranger Than Love" (dub version) – 5:28
"Anger Is Holy" – 9:10

UK 12" single (12 MUTE 59)
"This Is Stranger Than Love" – 7:13
"This Is Stranger Than Love" (dub version) – 5:28
"Survival" – 4:08

Personnel 
The Maffia
Keith LeBlanc – drums, percussion
Skip McDonald – guitar
Adrian Sherwood – sampler, programming, production
Doug Wimbish – bass
Mark Stewart – vocals

Charts

References

External links 
 

1987 songs
1987 singles
Mute Records singles
Mark Stewart (English musician) songs
Songs written by Mark Stewart (English musician)